The 1947 Railway Cup Hurling Championship was the 21st series of the inter-provincial hurling Railway Cup. Three matches were played between 9 March and 6 April 1947. It was contested by Connacht, Leinster, Munster and Ulster.

Munster entered the championship as the defending champions.

On 6 April 1947, Connacht won the Railway Cup after a 2-05 to 1-01 defeat of Munster in the final at Croke Park, Dublin. This was their first ever title.

Munster's Jerry O'Riordan was the Railway Cup top scorer with 4-00.

Results

Semi-finals

Final

Top scorers

Overall

Single game

Sources
 Donegan, Des, The Complete Handbook of Gaelic Games (DBA Publications Limited, 2005).

References

External links
 Munster Railway Cup-winning teams

Railway Cup Hurling Championship
Railway Cup Hurling Championship